The Ghamd (also transliterated as Ghamid) is an Azd Arab tribe of the Hejaz Region. They are predominantly Sunni, and are considered one of the oldest tribes of the Arabian peninsula. The Ghamid people are thought to be closely related to the neighboring tribe of Zahran.

The tribe's historical location is in the region of Al-Bahah in southwestern of Hejaz region of Saudi Arabia. Portions of the tribe also exist in Iraq, Jordan, Oman, Sudan, Egypt, the United Arab Emirates, and Yemen.

Sub-groups
Like most other Azd tribes in the southwestern region of the country, the Ghamd are socially divided into three large groups based on geography and lifestyle: the sarat mountaineers in the central highlands of Al-Baha and 'Hejaz, the badyah bedouins in the desert regions to the east in Najd and in some of parts of Bisha in Asir Region in the south, and finally the tohm who inhabit the narrow plain of Tihama on the Red Sea coast.

History 
The history of the Ghamd begins in the Pre-Islamic Era, where members of the Ghamd joined the early Muslim empire.

From the 900s CE to the 1400s CE, the Ghamd tribe warred with the Qarmations, Sulayhids, Seljuks, and Tihama.

17th century 
In 1638 CE, Zaid bin Mohsen invaded Ghamid territory. The invasion ended in reconciliation.

1- A battle against Bani Al-harith in Bisha: 

In the seventeenth century, several tribes associated with Bani Al-Harith took Tabalah, which was a part of the tribe of Khath’am. Despite the problems between Khath’am and Ghamid, Khath’am asked for assistance from the Hijaz knight Abu Dhahiba bin Jerry al-Ghamdi, who prepared 5 battalions and brought them from Wadi Bisha to Tabalah in a war of response. The land was for Khath’am and he reconciled between Bani Al-Harith and Al-Faz’, and made a Sirba in the valley led by the knight Salman bin Nami Al-Ghamdi and Ali Amer Al-Ghamdi for a while until things settled between the two neighboring tribes.

2- The battle of 'Asir: The Sharif of Mecca, with his knights from the Ghamid tribe, invaded the Asir regions and subjugated them.

3- The battle of Ranyah, against Subay'tribe: In the past, a border dispute occurred and some agreements were breached by some members of the Ghamid and Subai tribes in the eastern side of the Ranieh Valley, and due to this skirmishes continued for a period of time that resulted in a mobilization by the two tribes, and the tribes of Ghamid mobilized, and it became a battle that resulted in the victory of Ghamid.

4- Battle against Al-Shalawi tribe : This battle took place after the attack of the tribes of Bani Al-Harith, and most likely it was from Al-Shalawi, after they attacked the commercial convoys of Ghamid heading to Mecca. The battle ended with the victory of the Ghamid tribe.

In the year 1678, Sharif Muhammad Al-Harith, Sharif of Mecca, used his horsemen (Knights) from Ghamid tribe, with the supervision of the Hejaz and great crowds of Arabs, for the famous battle of (Al-Dhafa’a) between the Sharif of Mecca and the tribes of Dhafir in Al-Qassim.  The battle ended with the Sharif's victory over them, as the Sharif and his soldiers displaced them and expelled Al-Dhafeer from Najd and Al-Qassim to the regions of the mountain (Jabal Shammar).

At the end of the year 1678 (the Battle of Hadiya), the Sharif, along with Ghamid and Thaqif, attacked and supervised Bani Khalid in and took from them great spoils and killed among the famous Bani Khalid Saqan bin Khalaf Al Mani’ Al Khalidi, the Sheikh of Al Mani’ of Bani Khalid.

18th century 
In the year 1705 on the 26th of Ramadan, Sharif Saad bin Zaid came out against Sharif Abdul Karim bin Muhammad following a dispute between them. Sharif Saad sought help from Ghamid, and clashed with the defenders in the breach next to Al-Ma’alla. Sharif Saad managed to enter victoriously in Shawwal after the army of Sharif Abdul Karim fled from it.

19th century 
In 1813 the Ottoman Sultan gave Muhammad Ali Pasha  supplies, provisions and weapons. 

In 1814, where the famous battle in the Quraish Valley at the table between the army of Muhammad Ali Pasha and an army from Ghamid led by the knight / Salih bin Habash and the enemy led by the Turkish / Abdin Bey consisting of twenty thousand fighters and the Turkish army was defeated, so more than a thousand fighters were killed from Muhammad Ali Pasha’s army and the Turkish army withdrew to Taif.

At the end of the year, the men of Ghamid invaded the Turks and destroyed a fortress for the Turks in the town of Nasiriyah in Balharith, where they seized weapons, ammunition and horses.

In 1815 Imam Faisal bin Saud descended on the town of Turbah with ten thousand fighters, and the Muslims mobilized from the Hijaz tribes and from Ghamid under the leadership of the knight Hamdan bin Hatamel until their number reached twenty five thousand fighters from all the tribes. The Turks and those with them among the Egyptians fought a fierce fight that ended in victory for Faisal and those with him were able to kill a large number of Turkish-Egyptian forces (an estimated five hundred Ottoman soldiers).

In the year 1816, after the return of Muhammad Ali Pasha to Egypt, the tribes of Ghamid and the men of al-Ma'a co-operated

Some of the Asir tribes pushed back the Turks stationed in Tihama and drove them to Taif and to Jeddah.

In the year 1817 the fall of Bani Jarrah, the victory of the village of Bani Jarrah from Bani Zibyan against an army from the Bisha tribes led by Emir Omar Al-Sa'iri, and among the most famous of the dead was Colonel Medawi Al-Qushayri from Bisha.

In 1817, a campaign came by the Turks to burn the market of Ghadana and defeat the Turks at the hands of the sons of Ghamid. In 1818, the people of the region participated in the campaign of Khalil Pasha and the Sharif Muhammad Ibn Aun, the governor of Mecca.

And Solomon Sanjak against Asir.

In 1823, a campaign led by Muhammad bin Aun and Ahmad Pasha came to strike Asir, but it was destroyed from Ghamid. In 1833, Sharif Hazaa bin Aoun landed in Al Baha and warfare him, Ghamid. That same year, Ayed bin Mari arrived in Buraidah in the country of Ghamid, and on Thursday, Ghamid bin Mari participated and became Turk in Al Dhafir.

In 1837, the tribes of the southern Hijaz rebelled against the Ottoman rule and attacked the Ottoman garrisons in both Hejaz and Bilad Ghamid, after the arrival of one of the campaigns of the Asir ruler Ayed bin Mari. In 1838, they participated in Ghamid al-Sharif and defeated the army of Ayed bin Mari.

In 1848, Ghamid Ibn Ayed participated, and they broke the crowd of Sharif.

In 1851, the knight Thamer bin Thamer Al-Yassidi Al-Ghamdi breaks the knights of Sharif Abdul-Muttalib bin Ghalib and takes shelter for camels. That same year the Egyptian Hejaz campaign, which consisted of the Egyptian army, the Hijaz desert, and Harb and Mutair, was defeated at the hands of Ghamid and Asir.

In 1864, a campaign came under the leadership of the Sharif of Mecca (Abdullah bin Muhammad bin Abdul-Muin) to retake the Al-Baha region, but it failed.

In 1870, al-Ashraf led disciplinary campaigns for some tribes, and the Turkish campaign reached Al-Baha

Under the leadership of Sharif Abdullah bin Muhammad bin Abd al-Mu’in Sharif Makkah, and fierce skirmishes took place between the army and the rebellious population, which eventually led to Ibn Ayed’s intervention, and thus Saeed bin Ayed managed to lead the military campaign and entered the country of Ghamid and Zahran, and was welcomed by the men of Ghamid and Zahran.

In 1872, a battle took place in the Al-Baha market between the people of Ghamid and Zahran with the Turkish forces.

The siege of Abha took place in 1882.

In the year 1895, two murders took place between the tribes of Qahtan and the Turk on one side, and Ghamid and those with them on the one hand, and in them 900 of the Turks were killed and 300 were captured. Among the famous dead was Hussain bin Haif al-Rafidi al-Qahtani, who was killed with the Ottomans from Ghamid in Bilad Ghamid, and Ghamid looted 4 cannons, rifles and a bundle.

20th century 
In 1904, Ghamid joins Al-Sharif in the war against Al-Idrisi.

In 1915, the battle of Hajla against Asir.

The year 1922 put an end to the rebellion led by Hassan bin Ayedh in Asir.

In 1925, Ghamid participated in the battle of Abraq Raghama.

In 1929, the Battle of Hissar bin Fadel al-Maliki and Bani Harb from Bani Malik.

In 1932, the end of the Idrissi rebellion in Jizan.

Present day
Many members of this tribe have the surname Al-Ghamdi. Like many other tribes in the Arabian peninsula, many members of Ghamd, (Ghamdis), have emigrated in recent decades to three major metropolitan centers of Saudi Arabia; Riyadh, Jeddah, and Dammam.

References
The References of the battles are the following:

The Ghamid tribe, its lineage and history, to Ali Al-Mardi.

The enlightening lamp in the history of Asir.

Turkish wars in the southern region.

Bakrush bin Alas, who is revolting against the invasion of the Turks.

The Encyclopedia of the Patio Book.

Al-Ashraf's relationship with Ghamid and Zahran.

The popular legacies of Ghamid and Zahran, the first book.

The popular legacies of Ghamid and Zahran, the second book.

The popular legacies of Ghamid and Zahran, the third book.

The popular legacies of Ghamid and Zahran, book four / chapter on popular songs (al-Qaf).

Masterpiece statement on the past of Sarat Zahran.

Diwan al-Misbah from the poetry and obsession of Sheikh Ali Jamah ibn Ahmad al-Jarashi al-Ghamdi.

History of Mecca for the Sabai Part 1.

The goal of Al-Maram with the news of the Sultanate of the Holy Land (850-922 AH).

Reaching the villages at the bottom of the revival of news of Umm al-Qura.

My village, its history - its heritage - its customs.

Rafa'a tribe from Ghamid, written by Marzouq bin Muhammad Al-Ghamdi.

A book of events and poems from Bilad Ghamid, first edition (Al-Baha 2020), compiled and documented by Fahd bin Ahmed bin Muhammad Al-Talisi Al-Jaidi Al-Ghamdi.

Khair Al-Din Al-Zarkali.  The Book of Flags.

Documents from history, by Ali bin Saleh Alslouk.

Baljurashi variants three centuries.

Among the documents of the history of the Arabian Peninsula in the modern era, the first volume, selected, prepared and investigated by Prof. Dr. Abdul Rahim Abdul Rahman.

Arabia in British documents

(Najd and Hejaz) Volume Two 1916.

Bani Kabeer history and originality.

Asir under Ottoman rule (1289-1336 AH-1872-1914 AD).

Title of glory in the history of Najd, Ibn Bishr.

Sheikh Masoud bin Hajar documents.

Judge Abdulaziz Al-Mansouri document in its history.

Tribes of Saudi Arabia
Tribes of Arabia
Azd